U.S. Route 15 (US 15) is a 791.71 mi (1,274.13 km)-long United States highway, running from Walterboro, South Carolina, north to Painted Post, New York. In Pennsylvania, the highway runs for 194.89 miles (313.65 km), from the Maryland state line just south of Gettysburg, north to the New York state line near Lawrenceville.

Route description

US 15 enters Pennsylvania south of Gettysburg, Adams County, from Frederick County, Maryland, on a freeway alignment.  The route heads to the north and bypasses Gettysburg, where the route has an interchange with US 30.  The freeway alignment ends temporarily at York Springs, carrying US 15 on a four-lane, divided alignment with at-grade intersections until the route upgrades to a freeway again in Dillsburg.  The route continues north toward Harrisburg, where the freeway terminates again as US 15 joins with US 11. The two routes begin to follow the west shore of the Susquehanna River with limited-access sections until they split across the river from Sunbury.  US 15 continues north into Williamsport, joining I-180 and US 220. At I-180's western terminus, US 220, signed south, heads due west toward Jersey Shore and Lock Haven, while US 15 turns due north through Mansfield and crosses into New York near Lawrenceville, Tioga County.

The majority of US 15 is four lanes, alternating between limited and unlimited access. There are two segments where the road is two lanes. One is from East Pennsboro Township, Cumberland County, just north of the  interchange, to just south of Duncannon. The other is between White Deer and South Williamsport. The segment between Williamsport and the New York state line will eventually be designated I-99.

History

With the adoption of the US Highway System, US 15 originally terminated at Harrisburg, while US 111 serviced the modern route north of that point. In 1937, US 15 was extended north to the New York state line, effectively replacing US 111 north of Harrisburg. However, instead of replacing US 111's old routing directly, US 15 ran along the east bank of the Susquehanna River between Harrisburg and Williamsport while the road on the western bank of the river was PA 14 between Lemoyne and Duncannon, US 11 between Duncannon and Shamokin Dam, and PA 404 between Shamokin Dam and Williamsport. In 1941, US 15 was rerouted to follow the western bank of the river between Harrisburg and Williamsport, replacing PA 14 between Lemoyne and Duncannon, running concurrent with US 11 between Lemoyne and Shamokin Dam, and replacing the entire length of PA 404. The former alignment of US 15 on the east side of the river became PA 14.

Future
The section of US 15 north of Williamsport will gain the additional designation of I-99 when the connection from I-76 to I-86 is completed. No additional work is needed to upgrade this stretch, as it is already up to Interstate standards.

As part of the construction of the Central Susquehanna Valley Thruway, US 15 is planned to be rerouted to the new freeway between Selinsgrove and Union Township, bypassing Shamokin Dam. The former alignment of US 15 through Shamokin Dam will be designated as US 15 Bus., partly running concurrent with US 11.

Major intersections

See also

References

External links

Pennsylvania Highways: US 15
US 15 at AARoads.com
Pennsylvania Roads - US 15

15
 Pennsylvania
Roads in the Harrisburg, Pennsylvania area
Transportation in Adams County, Pennsylvania
Transportation in York County, Pennsylvania
Transportation in Cumberland County, Pennsylvania
Transportation in Perry County, Pennsylvania
Transportation in Dauphin County, Pennsylvania
Transportation in Juniata County, Pennsylvania
Transportation in Snyder County, Pennsylvania
Transportation in Union County, Pennsylvania
Transportation in Lycoming County, Pennsylvania
Transportation in Tioga County, Pennsylvania